Yuri Iosifovich Bogatikov (29 February 1932 — 8 December 2002) was a Soviet and Ukrainian singer (baritone). In 1985 he was honoured with the title of People's Artist of the USSR. His repertoire consisted of over 400 songs. He was the original performer of such songs as "I Haven't Been in Donbass  for a Long Time" ("Давно не бывал я в Донбассе" by Bogoslovsky), "Let's Talk" ("Давай, поговорим" by Hanok), "Don't Let Your Heart Harden, My Son" ("Не остуди своё сердце, сынок" by Migulya), "Remembering the Regimental Band" ("Воспоминание о полковом оркестре" by Gulyaev).

References

External links 

 Yuri Bogatikov «Золотий Фонд української естради»

1932 births
2002 deaths
Soviet male singers
20th-century Ukrainian male singers
People from Yenakiieve
People's Artists of the USSR
Recipients of the Lenin Komsomol Prize
Ukrainian baritones
Communist Party of the Soviet Union members